Dadkan may refer to:

Mohammad Dadkan (b. 1953), Iranian footballer
Dadkan, Iran, a village in Sistan and Baluchestan Province
Dadkan, Qazvin, a village in Qazvin Province